R. William Funk & Associates, headquartered in Dallas, Texas, is an executive search firm, specializing in higher education. Privately owned, R. William Funk and Associates works with universities on searches for positions such as president, chancellor, vice president, provost, and dean.

The firm was founded by the current CEO, R. William Funk, who has found more than 300 presidents and chancellors for universities. Funk has been referred to as the "guru of higher education" by the Chronicle of Higher Education, and was also named a top 200 recruiter in the world. The firm has placed the currently sitting presidents and chancellors at more than 65 universities.

References

External links
R. William Funk & Associates Home

Executive search firms